WDCK (101.1 FM) is a radio station licensed to Bloomfield, Indiana, United States.  The station airs a Classic country format and is currently owned by Mid-America Radio Group, Inc.

The station sign-on as WMYJ moved to 101.1. On November 21, 2016, 101.1 FM swap call letters with 88.9 FM, while WMYJ-FM moved back to 88.9 FM, the station began stunting with Christmas music. In January 2017 the station flipped to classic country format as K-101.

References

External links

DCK
Radio stations established in 2013
2013 establishments in Indiana